The French–Eversole feud occurred primarily from 1887–1894. The events occurred in the mountains of southeastern Kentucky and were mainly situated in Hazard, Perry County.  The two instigators of this feud were Joseph C. Eversole and Benjamin Fulton French, who were both merchants and lawyers and at one time were friendly. The war or feud was a media sensation and was covered by many US papers at the time. The First report was in the Louisville Courier-Journal on June 30, 1886 on Page 1. A listing of the various media reports is included at the end of this article. Ultimately, those media reports became the basis for various books written about the French-Eversole War.

Based on a report by General Sam Hill to Governor Simon Bolivar Buckner, the feud killed more than 20 men. Other historians exaggerated the numbers killed to about 74 deaths attributed to the feud.

Before the feud
Jacob Eversole (1760-1840) was one of the first settlers of the area moving from Lancaster County, PA. Originally spelled, 'Ebersohl', six brothers migrated from Europe to Pennsylvania: Abraham, Johannes, Peter, Yost, Carl and Jacob. One of Yost Ebersohl's son's Jacob, moved from Pennsylvania to Eastern Kentucky ca 1790-1800. When Perry County was created on November 2, 1820 by 'General' Elijah H. Combs he named the small group of streets Hazard as its seat. Both the County and the Town are named after General Oliver Hazard Perry, a hero of the War of 1812. The small town had only one road, scattered buildings, and only a few boards to walk on over the muddy streets. It became the trading center of the county with a population of around 100 during the feud.

Jacob Eversole's (1760-1840) son 'Woolery' G. Eversole married the daughter of Jesse Cornett (1761-1836) another founding family of Perry County, Kentucky. Woolery and Lucy (Cornett) Eversole had several children, one of which was Maj. John C. Eversole, USA who lead portions of the 14th Kentucky Cavalry and was assassinated during the Civil War. His son, Joseph C. Eversole was the leader of the Eversole Clan in the French Eversole Feud.

Eversole and French were very similar men. They were both lawyers, merchants, and very well off.  Joseph Eversole married a woman from another prominent Perry County family, Susan Combs. Susan was the daughter of Judge Josiah Henry Combs, one of the members of the Eversole clan. Susan's Great-grandfather was Elijah H. Combs who founded Hazard. French, however, was not a Kentuckian. He hailed from Tennessee but married a Kentuckian, Susan Lewis and thereby was related to influential families in Breathitt, Leslie and other Counties. Both Joseph C. Eversole and Benjamin Fulton French had competing mercantile stores in Hazard.

Cause of the feud
There are two supposed causes of the feud. One is romanticized and probably not true though it is the popular and much more interesting cause. The other is a definite and more reasonable cause for the start of the feud.

CAUSE 1 ('On Account of a Woman'): The popular story for the cause of the feud is a disagreement over a woman. As the story goes a clerk that worked in French's mercantile store was madly in love. One day the clerk saw the woman with Fulton French and he became jealous. He went to Joseph Eversole and told him that he had heard French say he sought to take his life. When Eversole questioned the clerk about the allegations he sat silent. Eversole warned him that he was taking his silence as fact that the allegations were true. Initially, Joe Eversole did not believe the clerk. He asked him to sign a sworn affidavit attesting to the plan to murder him.  This is what caused Eversole to believe that he needed protection and the reason for him to begin to gather an armed clan. French followed suit closely after and a war was unavoidable.  It is believed that this was the clerk's revenge on Fulton French.

Cause 2 ('Coal rights'): The more likely story (or a combination of the two) is that the two were businessmen and they came at odds with each other. After the civil war, companies began buying huge amounts of land for the coal underneath the mountains. French worked for one of these companies that was buying coal rights from illiterate farmers while Eversole was a local merchant and had loyalty to long-time citizens (most of whom he was related to). French was worried about getting the land at bottom dollar for the large companies he represented. Eversole saw this practice as cheating illiterate farmers. He began to travel the County and tell farmers that Fulton French was going to try and cheat them with low prices for 'coal rights'. French (as a non-native) has no such considerations regarding the mountain people of Eastern Kentucky. The resentment grew until they eventually raised their armies, which French reportedly paid $2 – $2.50 a day for his hired guns.

The assassinations
Ambush was the favored tactic of this feud rather than standard warfare. It was safer for the concealed perpetrators and responsibility for the attacks was more difficult to determine.  Many people lived, justifiably, in fear.

The first death of the feud was one of French's friends, Silas Gayheart. A dozen white men and a couple of African-Americans reportedly ambushed and killed Gayheart. The Eversoles denied the killing and many believed it was the cause of a different dispute that Gayheart had. French, however, blamed the Eversole clan.

One night French left Hazard, possibly to gather more men to attack Eversole. Once Eversole discovered this, he withdrew his forces and left a few men in town. He waited for French to attack the town so he could make a surprise attack of his own. Neither was fooled by these tactical maneuvers and blood was spared. When French finally reentered the town in June 1887 Eversole set out to meet him. The two sides had a shootout in town; only one of French's men was wounded. After a day of shooting at each other, French's forces withdrew.

This type of cat and mouse scuffle happened throughout the summer of 1887. The cost of paying these men day in and day out began taking their tolls on the businessmen as they almost were bankrupt (or at least were out of cash). Both sides owned most of the large land tracts in Perry County. Both sides agreed to a meeting at Big Creek and a peace was formulated. The written agreements were signed and witnessed. The agreement stated that they could return home, would disband their armies, and surrender their guns. The grudge was still there and, soon after their funds were replenished, French accused Eversole of taking his guns back from Judge Josiah Combs, Eversole's father-in-law. Eversole claimed that French hadn't witnessed that, that he hadn't disbanded his army, and that the deal only called for a partial surrender of arms. The short lived peace crumbled.

The next major incident occurred on September 15, 1887. Joe Eversole and Bill Gambriel, a French supporter and itinerate preacher, began arguing in the street in Hazard. This formed into a scuffle or fist fight. Some of Eversole's men shot at Gambriel and wounded him. While attempting to escape, another man, reportedly an officer, shot him. As Gambriel turned away from his attacker, Joe Eversole pulled his pistol out and shot Gambriel in the head, instantly killing him. One man was tried for the murder. The trial resulted in a hung jury the first time and an acquittal in the second trial. Joe Eversole was not tried because witnesses said that Gambriel had attacked Joe first.

There was a relative calm throughout the winter until Sunday, April 15, 1888. Joe Eversole, Nick Combs, his brother-in-law, and Judge Josiah Combs were on their way to Hyden for the regular term of the circuit court, of which Joe and Josiah had been members for years. Judge Combs was riding slightly ahead of Joe and Nick with policeman Tom Hollifield, who was transporting a prisoner (Mary Jones) to Hyden, when Josiah heard the gunfire. Josiah turned and saw Joe and Nick fall to the ground. Joe almost instantly died. After investigating, it appeared the attackers had been camping for days waiting on them. French was accused and indicted but left town with a posse in fear of retaliation. No one was ever convicted of the murders, but seven years later, 'Bad Tom' Smith, a paid French enforcer, would confess while standing on the gallows. He stated that he and Joseph Adkins committed the murders under orders from French.

After Joe Eversole's death, John Campbell took over the war against French. Campbell surrounded the town with guards, had men patrol the streets, and took on scouting the countryside. He feared a French attack so he only let people into town who knew the password.

While Campbell was still alive, Shade Combs had an idea that he could end the feud by killing French and a select few of his men. Campbell gave him men and he set out to do the deed. French got wind of the plot and set up an ambush of his own. Combs escaped only to succumb to a successful ambush soon after at his home.

Elijah Morgan, son-in-law to Judge Josiah Combs, was a French supporter and was the next to be assassinated on October 9, 1888. He was working on an agreement with Frank Grace when he was ambushed. He wanted peace and the Eversole clan told him to meet them in Hazard to discuss a deal. This was all a ploy to lure him in and he was murdered. It is widely believed this was is retaliation for the death of Shade Combs since they occurred so close together.

Judge Lilly, responsible for the law in Perry along with other counties, had had enough. He dispatched state troops to Hazard, which arrived in early November 1888. He wrote the governor on November 13, 1888, telling him of the need for troops and that he would not conduct court in Perry, along with other counties, without a state guard for fear of shootings. On November 14, 1888 Sam Hill, who was in charge of the state troops, wrote to Governor Buckner that only 35 people remained in town when they arrived. Many came back after the troops arrived and that the juries' ties to the clans or fear of the accused had caused lawlessness. The November 1888 term of court went by with ease since the troops were occupying the town.

Battle of Hazard
The Battle of Hazard occurred on the fourth court day, November 8, 1889. A supposedly inebriated Campbell was on Graveyard Hill and discharged his gun. A storekeeper saw him shooting, took aim, and killed Campbell with one shot. The people in the courthouse heard the shot, thought it was the feud, and scattered. The Eversole clan took control of the courthouse and French's men captured the jailhouse. Jesse Fields and Bob Profitt, both French men, escaped from the courthouse's second story and made it to the jail. That night they escaped the jailhouse to regroup with the rest of the French party. Jesse Fields and 'Bad' Tom Smith then took the high ground on Graveyard Hill. J. McKnight, an Eversole man, attempted to run across the street with a friend to gain some ground and was shot dead by French's men. The Eversoles retreated across the river after their ammo was exhausted. They left Green Morris and one other along the river bank so they could escape safely. When Jesse Fields and Tom Smith pursued, Morris opened fire and hit Fields in the arm. The Battle of Hazard was over.

The end
Following the incidents in Hazard, the courthouse was burned down on July 4, 1890 though the records were saved.

Robin Cornett, an Eversole supporter, returned to his home hoping to be done with the feud. He was ambushed and killed in July 1890 when he went to cut a tree in the forest near his home.

This was the final straw for Judge Lilly. He appeared with state troops for a special August court term in 1890 that would be held in a tent. They quickly brought up each of the accused and sent them to Clark County to be tried. Lilly knew that there is no way any would have a fair trial in Hazard and for fear of another battle. None were allowed bail at first. The jail became so full they had to keep the men in a guarded tent. The "Blanket Court" worked well and there was little to no incidents until 1894.

In 1894, Josiah Combs decided to return to the home he loved, hoping the fighting was all over. He was ambushed and killed while having a conversation with friends outside of his house. A large field of corn was growing in Hazard. The killers: Joe Adkins, Jesse Fields, and Boone Frazier hid in the corn and fired at Judge Combs. None of this would have come to light except that 'Bad' Tom Smith had been caught on a different murder and sentenced to death row previously for the murder of Dr. John E. Rader. He gave a gallows confession outlining how Fulton French had organized the plot and that Joe Adkins had fired the fatal shot that killed Judge Combs. French was acquitted of the charges, Frazier was never caught, Fields was sentenced to life then acquitted in a second trial, and Adkins received life in both trials, though he only served 8 years before being released.

After the events in Hazard, Fulton French began wearing a bulletproof vest. Years later, in 1913, French came across Susan Eversole, Joe's Widow, and her son Harry Clay Eversole (then 28), sometimes referred to as 'One Arm' Harry since he lost an arm in childhood. Fulton said "Good Morning, Mrs. Eversole". Harry took out his pistol and shot him in the spleen. Harry was only charged a $75 fine for disturbing the peace. French did die from the shot from 'One Arm' Harry, though it took him over a year to finally succumb from the wound in 1915.

Media coverage
During the period from 1886 when notice arrived of Benjamin Fulton French amassing a private army to assassinate Joseph C. Eversole the public and media followed the twists and turns of the French-Eversole Feud and the various trials, battles, indictments, convictions, re-trials, and death of the participants. This is a list of the newspapers that ran articles about the war in order of appearance:

First Notice of Feud

June 30, 1886 Louisville Courier-Journal, Louisville, Ky Page 1
July 24, 1886 St. Louis Post Dispatch, St. Louis, Missouri Page 8
July 25, 1886 Topeka Daily Capital, Topeka Kansas, Page 1
August 24, 1886 The Republic, Columbus, Indiana, Page 1
August 25, 1886 Wilkes-Barre Record, Wilkes-Barre, PA, page 1
September 3, 1886 The Hickman Courier, Hickman, Ky, Page 1
November 16, 1886 St. Paul Globe, St. Paul, Minnesota, Page 1

The Peace Treaty

November 22, 1886 Newton Daily Republican, Newton, Kansas, Page 2
November 25, 1886 Scott Weekly Monitor, Scott, Kansas, Page 6
November 27, 1886 Phillipsburg Herald, Phillipsburg, Kansas, Page 1
December 2, 1886 Phillipsburg Herald, Phillipsburg, Kansas, Page 1
December 2, 1886 Greensboro North State, Greensboro, NC, Page 1

Assassination of Joseph C. Eversole

April 17, 1888 Louisville Courier-Journal, Louisville, Ky, Page 1
November 14, 1888 Decauter Herald, Decauter, Illinois, Page 1
November 14, 1888 Ottawa Daily Republic, Ottawa, Kansas, page 1
December 2, 1888 St. Louis Post Dispatch, St. Louis, Missouri, Page 6
December 21, 1888 Columbus Journal, Columbus, Nebraska, Page 2
December 21, 1888 Kingston Daily Freeman, Kingston, NY, Page 2
December 23, 1888 Democrat and Chronicle, Rochester, NY, Page 1
December 23, 1888 Galveston Daily News, Galveston, Texas, Page 3
December 23, 1888 St. Paul Globe, St. Paul, Minnesota, page 22
December 23, 1888 Detroit Free Press, Detroit, Michigan, page 3
December 24, 1888 Ottawa Daily Republic, Ottawa, Kansas, Page 2
December 27, 1888 Worthington Advance, Worthington, Minnesota, Page 2
January 28, 1889 St. Louis Post Dispatch, St. Louis, Missouri, page 5

Battle of Hazard

November 14, 1889 Salina Daily Republican, Salina, Kansas, Page 1
November 15, 1889 Lawrence Daily Journal, Lawrence, Kansas, Page 1
November 15, 1889 Times Picayune, New Orleans, Louisiana, Page 2
November 15, 1889 The Cincinnati Enquirer, Cincinnati, Ohio, Page 1
November 15, 1889 Detroit Free Press, Detroit, Michigan, Page 2
November 15, 1889 Arkansas City Daily Traveler, Arkansas City, Kansas, Page 8
November 15, 1889 The Pittsburgh Post, Pittsburgh, PA, Page 6
November 16, 1889 Scranton Republican, Scranton, PA, Page 1
November 16, 1889 The Times, Philadelphia, PA, Page 4
November 23, 1889 Ohio Democrat, Logan, Ohio, Page 2
December 21, 1889 People's Press, Winston-Salem, NC, Page 3

Continuing Bloodshed

August 10, 1890 St. Louis Post Dispatch, St. Louis, Missouri, Page 3
August 17, 1890 Independent Record, Helena, Montana, Page 9
August 29, 1890 The Tennessean, Nashville, TN, Page 1
August 29, 1890 Daily Arkansas Gazette, Little Rock, Arkansas, page 1
August 29, 1890 Indianapolis News, Indianapolis, Indiana, Page 1
August 30, 1890 Ironwood Times, Ironwood, Michigan, Page 1
September 1, 1890 Independent Record, Helena, Montana, Page 1
September 1, 1890 The Tennessean, Nashville, Tn, Page 1
September 1, 1890 Sandusky Register, Sandusky, Ohio, Page 1
September 2, 1890 Cincinnati Enquirer, Cincinnati, Ohio, Page 1
September 2, 1890 Detroit Free Press, Detroit, Michigan, Page 4
September 3, 1890 Somerset herald, Somerset, PA, page 2
September 3, 1890 The Republic, Columbus, Indiana, Page 1
September 4, 1890 The Onaga Herald, Onaga, Kansas, Page 1
September 7, 1890 Cincinnati Enquirer, Cincinnati, Ohio, Page 17
September 8, 1890 The World, New York City, New York, Page 11
September 11, 1890 The Index, Hermitage, Missouri, Page 1
September 12, 1890 Big Stone Gap Post, Big Stone Gap, VA, Page 3
September 19, 1890 Cincinnati Enquirer, Cincinnati, Ohio, Page 1
September 20, 1890 The Lima News, Lima, Ohio, Page 1
September 27, 1890 Chicago Daily Tribune, Chicago, Illinois, Page 4

Bad Tom Smith given Bail

November 24, 1890 McPherson Daily Republican, McPherson, Kansas, Page 4

Continuing Bloodshed

May 5, 1891 Scott Daily Monitor, Scott, Kansas, Page 1
May 8, 1891 Lebanon Daily News, Lebanon, PA, Page 1
February 28, 1892 St. Paul Globe, St. Paul, Minnesota, Page 16
November 7, 1892 San Francisco Call, San Francisco, CA, page 16

False reports that Josiah Combs elderly wife was murdered

May 21, 1893 Davenport Democrat and Leader, Davenport, Iowa, Page 9
May 25, 1893 Warren Sheaf, Warren, Minnesota, Page 3
May 25, 1893 Big Stone Gap Post, Big Stone Gap, VA, Page 3
June 1, 1893 Der Fortshritt (in German), New Ulm, Minnesota, Page 2
June 1, 1893 Princeton Union, Princeton, Minnesota, Page 2

Indictments, Trials and Acquittals

October 10, 1893 Louisville Courier-Journal, Louisville, KY, Page 4
December 15, 1893 Louisville Courier-Journal, Louisville, KY, Page 5

Judge Josiah Combs Targeted and killed

October 18, 1894 Atchison Daily Champion, Atchison, Kansas, Page 1
October 27, 1894 Perrysburg Journal, Perrysburg, Ohio, Page 2
December 12, 1894 New York Times, New York, New York, Page 1
December 12, 1894 Scranton Republican, Scranton, PA, page 2

More Trials, More indictments

January 24, 1895 Springfield Leader, Springfield, Missouri, Page 1
April 14, 1895 St. Louis Post Dispatch, St. Louis, Missouri, Page 21
April 14, 1895 Louisville Courier-Journal, Louisville, KY, Page 15
April 25, 1895 Louisville Courier-Journal, Louisville, KY Page 1
June 15, 1895 Alexandria Gazette, Alexandria, Virginia, Page 2

Bad Tom Smith Confesses

June 29, 1895 Daily Democrat, Huntington, Indiana, Page 1
June 29, 1895 Cincinnati Enquirer, Cincinnati, Ohio, Page 1 and 5
December 9, 1895 Cincinnati Enquirer, Cincinnati, Ohio, Page 1

December 16, 1895 Louisville Courier-Journal, Louisville, KY, Page 1
December 17, 1895 Reading Times, Reading, PA, Page 1
July 7, 1899 The Evening Times, Washington, DC, Page 3
June 6, 1903 The Pittsburgh Press, Pittsburgh, PA, Page 40

Fulton French Charged with Murder over Marcum case

March 4, 1904 Mountain Advocate, Barbourville, KY, Page 1
March 25, 1904 Hartford Republican, Hartford, KY, Page 2
August 17, 1906 Louisville Courier-Journal, Louisville, KY, Page 1
March 17, 1907 Cincinnati Enquirer, Cincinnati, Ohio, Page 27
March 24, 1907 Washington Times, Washington, DC, Page 44
June 17, 1907 Janesville Daily Gazette, Janesville, Wisconsin, Page 1
June 17, 1907 Kansas City Globe, Kansas City, Kansas, Page 1
June 17, 1907 Goldsboro Daily Argus, Goldsboro, NC, Page 1
November 30, 1907 The Pantagraph, Bloomington, Illinois, Page 1
December 10, 1907 Louisville Courier-Journal, Louisville, KY, Page 1
December 28, 1907 Paducah Evening Sun, Paducah, KY, Page 1
November 20, 1908 New York Times, New York, New York, Page 2
December 4, 1908 Hartford Republican, Hartford, Kentucky, Page 6

Fulton French and Mrs. Eversole meet

July 31, 1910 Louisville Courier-Journal, Louisville, KY, Page 12

Fulton French dies
January 6, 1915 Louisville Courier-Journal, Louisville, KY, Page 1
January 7, 1915 Louisville Courier-Journal, Louisville, KY, Page 4
January 7, 1915 Public Ledger, Maysville, KY, Page 4

References

The French and Eversole War
Newspaper articles on French Eversole Feud in Perry County, Kentucky
Otterbein, Keith F. Five Feuds: An Analysis of Homicides in Eastern Kentucky in the Late Nineteenth Century.  Department of Anthropology, University at Buffalo, State University of New York, Buffalo, NY 14261.
Mutzenberg, C. (2012). Kentucky's Famous Feuds and Tragedies : Authentic History of the World Renowned Vendettas of the Dark and Bloody Ground. University of Toronto Libraries 

Ed Pearce, J. (1994). Days of Darkness: The Feuds of Eastern Kentucky. The University Press of Kentucky

External links

History of Kentucky
Perry County, Kentucky
History of the Southern United States
Culture of the Southern United States
American folklore
Society of Appalachia
Feuds in the United States
Folklore of the Southern United States